Pearlmelia Marie Gonzalez (born August 12, 1986) is an American mixed martial artist. She formerly competed for Ultimate Fighting Championships, and currently fights in the strawweight division of the Invicta Fighting Championships.

Background 
Gonzalez was born in Chicago, Illinois. Her parents were both drug and alcohol abusers, disturbing her childhood and adolescence. Her parents eventually separated, leaving Pearl with her father and rest of the siblings with their mother. Her father, after getting clean, placed her in combat sport classes when she was eleven years old. Gonzalez later trained in boxing, and won the Golden Gloves amateur championship in 2008. She stopped fighting for a while in order to raise her younger sister, but went back to fighting at 21 at Combat-Do in Cicero, IL under Grappling Hall of Famer Bob Schirmer. Pearl is currently the host of the Extra Rounds Podcast on UFC FIGHT PASS.

She is of Mexican, Puerto Rican, Filipino, Irish and African-American descent.

Mixed martial arts career

Early career 
Gonzalez started her amateur career in 2009, and fought professionally since 2012. She competed for the Xtreme Fighting  Championship, Xtreme Fighting Organization, Splode Fight Series, and Hoosier Fight Club. Gonzalez amassed a record of 6–1 prior to being signed by UFC.

Ultimate Fighting Championships 

Gonzalez made her promotional debut on April 8, 2017, at UFC 210 against Cynthia Calvillo.  She lost the fight via rear-naked choke.

Her next fight came on October 7, 2017, facing Poliana Botelho at UFC 216. She lost the fight via unanimous decision.

After two losses at UFC, Gonzalez was released by UFC and she joined Invicta Fighting Championships shortly after.

Invicta Fighting Championships 
Gonzalez made her promotional debut on March 24, 2018, at Invicta FC 28: Mizuki vs. Jandiroba against Kali Robbins. and she won the fight via unanimous decision.

Gonzalez faced Barbara Acioly on May 4, 2018, at Invicta FC 29: Kaufman vs. Lehner. She submitted Acioly and won the fight.

Gonzalez faced Daiane Firmino on September 1, 2018, at Invicta FC 31: Jandiroba vs. Morandin. She won the fight via unanimous decision.

Gonzalez faced Vanessa Porto for the vacant Invicta FC Flyweight Championship at Invicta FC 34 on February 15, 2019. She lost the fight via technical decision.

On October 4, 2019, Gonzalez faced Brogan Walker-Sanchez at Invicta FC 37. She won the fight via unanimous decision.

Gonzalez faced Miranda Maverick at Invicta FC 39 on February 7, 2020. She lost the fight via unanimous decision.

Gonzalez was then scheduled to face Erin Blanchfield for the vacant Invicta FC Flyweight Championship at Invicta FC 43 on November 20, 2020. However, Gonzalez was forced to withdraw due to contracting COVID-19 and the bout was supposed to be postponed to the future. However, her contract with the organization expired before she had the following bout.

Bare-knuckle boxing
On April 22, 2021, it was announced that Gonzalez had signed a multi-fight contract with Bare Knuckle Fighting Championship. On June 1, 2021, it was announced that Gonzalez was expected to make her debut against Charisa Sigala at BKFC 18 on June 26, 2021. She won the debut via unanimous decision.

Her sophomore appearance came against Britain Hart at BKFC 22 on November 12, 2021. She lost the fight via unanimous decision and subsequently stated that she will be moving away from the sport.

Professional boxing career
After winning her first two professional boxing bouts, she is expected to face Gina Mazany at Gamebred Boxing 4 on April 1, 2023.

Championships and accomplishments

Mixed martial arts 
 Xtreme Fighting Championships 
 Xtreme Fighting Championships Women's Strawweight Champion vs. Cortney Casey

Mixed martial arts record 

|-
| Loss
| align=center| 10–5
| Miranda Maverick
| Decision (unanimous)
| Invicta FC 39: Frey vs. Cummins II
| 
| align=center| 3
| align=center| 5:00
| Kansas City, Kansas, United States
|
|-
| Win
| align=center| 10–4
| Brogan Walker-Sanchez
| Decision (unanimous)
| Invicta FC 37: Gonzalez vs. Sanchez
| 
| align=center| 3
| align=center| 5:00
| Kansas City, Kansas, United States
|
|-
| Loss
| align=center| 9–4
| Vanessa Porto
| Technical Decision (unanimous)
| Invicta FC 34: Porto vs. Gonzalez
| 
| align=center| 4
| align=center| 2:34
| Kansas City, Missouri, United States
| For the vacant Invicta FC Flyweight Championship.  Bout was stopped as Gonzalez inadvertently poked Porto in the eye, rendering her unable to continue.
|-
| Win
| align=center| 9–3
| Daiane Firmino
| Decision (unanimous)
| Invicta FC 31: Jandiroba vs. Morandin
| 
| align=center| 3
| align=center| 5:00
| Kansas City, Missouri, United States
|
|-
| Win
| align=center| 8–3
| Barbara Acioly
| Submission (armbar)
| Invicta FC 29: Kaufman vs. Lehner
| 
| align=center| 1
| align=center| 1:30
| Kansas City, Missouri, United States
|
|-
| Win
| align=center| 7–3
| Kali Robbins
| Decision (unanimous)
| Invicta FC 28: Mizuki vs. Jandiroba
| 
| align=center| 3
| align=center| 5:00
| Salt Lake City, Utah, United States
|
|-
| Loss
| align=center| 6–3
| Poliana Botelho
| Decision (unanimous)
| UFC 216
| 
| align=center| 3
| align=center| 5:00
| Las Vegas, Nevada, United States
|
|-
| Loss
| align=center| 6–2
| Cynthia Calvillo
| Submission (rear-naked choke)
| UFC 210
| 
| align=center| 3
| align=center| 3:45
| Buffalo, New York, United States
|
|-
| Win
| align=center| 6–1
| Katie Klimansky-Casimir
| Submission (armbar)
| Hoosier Fight Club 28
| 
| align=center| 2
| align=center| 4:20
| Hammond, Indiana, United States
|
|-
| Win
| align=center| 5–1
| Valeria Mejia
| TKO (punches)
| Xtreme Fighting Organization 56
| 
| align=center| 1
| align=center|3:34
| Island Lake, Illinois, United States
|
|-
| Win
| align=center| 4–1
| Katie Anita Runyan
| Submission (armbar)
| Xplode Fight Series: Heat
| 
| align=center| 1
| align=center|0:39
| Valley Center, California, United States
|
|-
| Win
| align=center| 3–1
| Nikki Duncan
| Decision (unanimous)
| Xtreme Fighting Organization 55
| 
| align=center| 3
| align=center| 5:00
| Chicago, Illinois, United States
|
|-
| Win
| align=center| 2–1
| Cortney Casey
| Submission (armbar)
| Xtreme Fighting Championships 26
| 
| align=center| 3
| align=center| 4:43
| Nashville, Tennessee, United States
|
|-
| Win
| align=center| 1–1
| Suzie Montero
| Submission (armbar)
| Xtreme Fighting Championships 22
| 
| align=center| 1
| align=center|4:56
| Charlotte, North Carolina, United States
|
|-
| Loss
| align=center| 0–1
| Munah Holland
| Decision (majority)
| Ring of Combat 39
| 
| align=center| 3
| align=center| 5:00
| Atlantic City, New Jersey, United States
|
|-

Professional boxing record

Bare knuckle boxing record

|-
|Loss
|align=center|1–1
|Britain Hart
|Decision (unanimous)
|BKFC 22
| 
|align=center|5
|align=center|2:00
|Miami, Florida, United States
|
|-
|Win
|align=center|1–0
|Charisa Sigala
|Decision (unanimous)
|BKFC 18
|
|align=center|5
|align=center|2:00
|Miami, Florida, United States
|
|-

See also 
 List of current Invicta FC fighters
 List of female mixed martial artists

References

External links 
 
 
 Pearl Gonzalez at Invicta FC

1986 births
Living people
American female mixed martial artists
American practitioners of Brazilian jiu-jitsu
Female Brazilian jiu-jitsu practitioners
American women boxers
Bare-knuckle boxers
American mixed martial artists of Mexican descent
American mixed martial artists of Filipino descent
American sportspeople of Puerto Rican descent
American people of Irish descent
Strawweight mixed martial artists
Mixed martial artists utilizing boxing
Mixed martial artists utilizing Brazilian jiu-jitsu
Mixed martial artists from Illinois
Sportspeople from Chicago
Ultimate Fighting Championship female fighters